Marcelo Ríos was the defending champion but lost in the second round to Adrian Voinea.

Francisco Clavet won in the final 7–5, 6–1, 6–1 against Younes El Aynaoui.

Seeds
Champion seeds are indicated in bold while text in italics indicates the round in which that seed was eliminated.

Draw

Finals

Section 1

Section 2

External links
 ATP main draw

Dutch Open (tennis)
1996 ATP Tour
1996 Dutch Open (tennis)